Rosy Mazzacurati (born in 1938) is an Italian former film and stage actress.

Life and career
Born in Ferrara, Mazzacurati was the daughter of the sculptor and painter Renato Marino Mazzacurati. Eager to embark on an acting career, at young age she moved to Rome, where she enrolled the Centro Sperimentale di Cinematografia, graduating in 1953. She had made her film debut one year earlier, in the Leonardo Cortese's drama Art. 519 codice penale.

During her career Mazzacurati was often cast in supporting roles, notably playing a role of weight in Michelangelo Antonioni's movie La Notte. She was also active on stage. Mazzacurati retired in the mid-1960s.

Selected filmography
 Article 519, Penal Code (1952)
 Cavalcade of Song  (1953)
 The Beach (1954)
 Ore 10: lezione di canto (1955)
 Red and Black (1955)
 Young Husbands (1958)
 The Black Chapel (1959)
 La Notte (1961) 
 La monaca di Monza (1962)

References

Other websites
 

1938 births
Actors from Ferrara
Italian film actresses
Italian stage actresses
20th-century Italian actresses
Living people
Centro Sperimentale di Cinematografia alumni